Bill Kelly (born in Elk Grove Village, Illinois) is an American screenwriter. He is best known for writing the Disney film Enchanted.

Filmography
 2007 Enchanted
 2007 Premonition
 1999 Blast from the Past

References

External links

Living people
American male screenwriters
People from Elk Grove Village, Illinois
Screenwriters from Illinois
Year of birth missing (living people)